Kleiner Weißer See is a lake in Mecklenburgische Seenplatte, Mecklenburgische Seenplatte, Mecklenburg-Vorpommern, Germany. At an elevation of 59 m, its surface area is 0.02 km².

Lakes of Mecklenburg-Western Pomerania